Kevin Baker (born 1958) is an American novelist, political commentator, and journalist.

Early life
Baker was born in Englewood, New Jersey, and grew up in Rockport, Massachusetts. As a youth, he worked on the local newspaper Gloucester Daily Times, covering school-boy sports, as well as town meetings and other civic affairs. He graduated from Columbia University in 1980, with a major in political science.

Career
In 1993, Baker's first book, Sometimes You See it Coming (1993), a contemporary baseball novel loosely based on the life of Ty Cobb, was published.

He was the chief historical researcher on Harold Evans’s illustrated  history of the United States, The American Century (1998). He was a columnist ("In the News") for American Heritage magazine from 1998 to 2007. In 2009 appeared on C-SPAN's Washington Journal and The Colbert Report, to discuss the Obama presidency.

Baker is the author of the City of Fire trilogy, published by HarperCollins, which consists of the following historical novels: Dreamland (1998); the bestselling Paradise Alley (2002); and Strivers Row (2006). The middle volume of the trilogy won the 2003 James Fenimore Cooper Prize for Best Historical Fiction and the 2003 American Book Award. Paradise Alley was also chosen by bestselling Angela's Ashes author, Frank McCourt, as a Today show book club selection.

In 2009, he wrote a Luna Park, a graphic novel illustrated by Croatian artist Danijel Žeželj.

A writer of over 200 newspaper and magazine articles, Baker was the recipient of a 2017 Guggenheim fellowship for non-fiction.

Baker lives in New York City, where he is a contributing editor to and bi-monthly columnist for Harper's Magazine, and a regular contributor to Politico.com, The New Republic, The New York Times, and The New York Times Book Review.

Bibliography 
 Sometimes You See It Coming (1993)
 The American Century (1998; with Harold Evans and Gail Buckland)
 Dreamland (1999)
 Paradise Alley (2002)
 “Rudy Giuliani and the Myth of Modern New York” (2005; in America's Mayor: The Hidden History of Giuliani's New York)
 “Lost-Found Nation: The Last Meeting Between Elijah Muhammad and W.D. Fard" (2006; in I Wish I'd Been There)
 Strivers Row (2006)
 Luna Park (2011; with artist Danijel Žeželj)
 The Big Crowd (2013)
 Becoming Mr. October (2014)
 America The Ingenious: How a nation of dreamers, immigrants, and tinkerers changed the world (2016)

References

Further reading
Kevin Baker's Personal Website

Living people
1958 births
Date of birth missing (living people)
20th-century American male writers
20th-century American novelists
21st-century American non-fiction writers
21st-century American novelists
American Book Award winners
American columnists
American male journalists
American male novelists
Columbia College (New York) alumni
Harper's Magazine people
James Fenimore Cooper Prize winners
Novelists from Massachusetts
Novelists from New Jersey
People from Englewood, New Jersey
People from Rockport, Massachusetts
21st-century American male writers